Joelma Patrícia da Cunha Viegas a.k.a. Cajó, (born October 15, 1986) is a team handball player from Angola. She plays on the Angola women's national handball team, and participated at the 2011 World Women's Handball Championship in Brazil and the 2012 Summer Olympics.

At the club level, she plays for Angolan side Primeiro de Agosto at the Angolan Handball league

References

External links
 

1986 births
Living people
Handball players from Luanda
Angolan female handball players
Handball players at the 2012 Summer Olympics
Olympic handball players of Angola
African Games gold medalists for Angola
African Games medalists in handball
Competitors at the 2011 All-Africa Games